Claire Darling is a 2018 French drama film directed by Julie Bertuccelli. This is the adaptation of Lynda Rutledge's novel Faith Bass Darling’s Last Garage Sale.

Plot
In Verderonne, a small village in the Oise, it is the first day of summer and Claire Darling wakes up persuaded to live her last day. She then decides to empty her house and sells everything without distinction, Tiffany lamps with the pendulum collection. The beloved objects echo her tragic and flamboyant life. This latest madness brings back Marie, her daughter, whom she has not seen for 20 years.

Cast
Catherine Deneuve - Claire Darling
Alice Taglioni - Young Claire Darling
Chiara Mastroianni - Marie Darling
Samir Guesmi - Amir
Laure Calamy - Martine Leroy
Olivier Rabourdin - Claude Darling
Johan Leysen - Père Georges

Production
The film was shot in the village of Verderonne in northern France.

Response

Box office
Claire Darling grossed $0 in North America and a total worldwide of $1 million. With 85 000 spectators in France, the film is a heavy public failure.

Critical reception
On AlloCiné, the film has a score of 3 out of 5. Télérama gives 4 stars to this documentary and compliments Catherine Deneuve: "unfathomable, reign on this tale." Didier Péron de Libération found in contrast that "the film, or the filmmaker [...] draws no interesting part of the nature of the game Deneuve". CineSeries is mixed but leaves a positive opinion: "a moving portrait of a courageous woman and imperfect mother."

References

External links
 
 

2018 films
French nonlinear narrative films
2010s French films